John Edward Hutton (March 28, 1828 – December 28, 1893) was a U.S. Representative from Missouri.

Born in Polk County, Tennessee, Hutton moved with his parents to Troy, Missouri, in 1831.
He attended the common schools.
He taught school and at the same time studied medicine.
He attended lectures at Pope's Medical College, St. Louis, Missouri.
He was graduated in medicine and began practice in Warrenton, Missouri, in 1860.
During the Civil War he entered the Union Army and was commissioned colonel of the Fifty-ninth Regiment, Missouri Volunteer Infantry.
He studied law.
He was admitted to the bar in 1864 and commenced practice in Warrenton, Missouri.
He moved to Mexico, Missouri, in 1865 and continued to practice law until 1873, when he became the owner and publisher of the Intelligencer, a Democratic newspaper.

Hutton was elected as a Democrat to the Forty-ninth and Fiftieth Congresses (March 4, 1885 – March 3, 1889).
He was not a candidate for renomination in 1888.
He resumed his activities as a physician and also engaged in the practice of law.
He died in Mexico, Missouri, December 28, 1893.
He was interred in Elmwood Cemetery.

References

1828 births
1893 deaths
Union Army colonels
People from Mexico, Missouri
People of Missouri in the American Civil War
Missouri lawyers
Physicians from Missouri
Editors of Missouri newspapers
Democratic Party members of the United States House of Representatives from Missouri
19th-century American politicians
People from Troy, Missouri
People from Warrenton, Missouri
People from Polk County, Tennessee
19th-century American lawyers